Lode Anthonis (28 November 1922 – 12 January 1992) was a Belgian racing cyclist who competed professionally from 1948 to 1962. He won the Belgian national road race title in 1951. He is buried in Tremelo.

Major results

1948
 7th Nationale Sluitingprijs
1949
 1st Kampenhout–Charleroi–Kampenhout
 4th Nationale Sluitingprijs
 5th Omloop Het Volk
 8th Tour of Flanders
 9th Overall Tour of Belgium
1951
 1st  Road race, National Road Championships
1952
 2nd Roubaix–Huy
 6th Overall Dwars door België
 9th Omloop Het Volk
 10th Tour of Flanders
1953
 3rd Paris–Brussels
1954
 7th Omloop Het Volk
1955
 1st Omloop Het Volk
 7th Gent–Wevelgem
 10th Tour of Flanders
1957
 6th Nationale Sluitingprijs

References

External links

1922 births
1992 deaths
People from Tremelo
Belgian male cyclists
Cyclists from Flemish Brabant
20th-century Belgian people